Cosmopterix angoonae is a moth of the family Cosmopterigidae. It is known from Thailand.

References

angoonae
Moths described in 1987